Inés Gorrochategui (born 13 June 1973) is a former professional female tennis player from Argentina. She reached her career-high singles ranking world No. 19 on October 17, 1994. Her best performance at a Grand Slam championship came when she got to the quarterfinals of the 1994 French Open, defeating Michelle Jaggard-Lai, Naoko Sawamatsu, Helena Suková and Iva Majoli before losing to Steffi Graf. Inés Gorrochategui represented her country regularly in the Fed Cup from 1990 to 1999, reaching the semi-finals in 1993 with Labat and Tarabini.

Titles

Doubles (7)
1991: São Paulo (with Mercedes Paz)
1992: Taranto (with Amanda Coetzer)
1993: Prague (with Patricia Tarabini)
1993: Budapest (with Caroline Vis)
1995: Amelia Island (with Amanda Coetzer)
1995: Berlin (with Amanda Coetzer)
1997: Warsaw (with Ruxandra Dragomir)

Runner-ups

Singles (3)
1991: Paris Clarins Open (lost to Conchita Martínez)
1994: Auckland (lost to Ginger Helgeson-Nielsen)
1999: Warsaw (lost to Cristina Torrens Valero)

ITF finals

Singles: 8 (7–1)

Doubles: 8 (7–1)

References

External links
 
 
 

1973 births
Argentine female tennis players
Argentine people of Basque descent
French Open junior champions
Hopman Cup competitors
Living people
Sportspeople from Córdoba, Argentina
Grand Slam (tennis) champions in girls' doubles